Aliaksandr (Saša) Vasilievič (also known as Aliaksandr Vasilevich; born 14 September 1974) is a Belarusian businessman, gallerist, publisher, opposition activist, and a political prisoner.

Career and imprisonment 
Vasilievič is a co-founder of the online media outlets kyky.org and The Village Belarus, owner of the Vondel/Hepta agency and a former owner of the Ў Gallery of Contemporary Art.

On 28 July 2020 Vasilievič was detained by police in the KGB building in Minsk, after he tried to file a petition requesting the release on bail of the arrested presidential nominee Viktar Babaryka. The court of the Frunzienski district of Minsk sentenced Vasilievič to 14 days of administrative detention for his alleged participation in an unauthorized protest and chanting outside the KGB building ‘Freedom to Babaryka!’

Prior to that, his apartment, office and the companies he managed had been searched.

On 4 September 2020 Vasilievič was formally charged. Due to a non-disclosure agreement signed by his lawyer, it is yet unknown what charge the businessman is facing. Nevertheless, several media announced that Vasilievič was charged with tax evasion.

On 7 September 2020 Vasilievič was declared political prisoner by human rights organisations which explained that:

“The arrest of Aliaksandr Vasilevich […] is a continuation of the wave of repression that was triggered by the calling of the presidential election by the parliament in early May. […] The repression intensified in the post-election period, leading to a sharp increase in the number of people detained and arrested for political reasons. […] Given these circumstances, we conclude that the real grounds for the criminal prosecution […] are political motives aimed at terminating or decreasing their public activities.”

On 10 October 2020 Vasilievič was present in the KGB pre-trial detention centre at a meeting of Lukashenka with his main political opponents.

Family 
Vasilievič is married to Nadzeya Zeliankova who is also a suspect in Vasilievič's criminal case. They have two daughters. The younger, Uršulia, was born during her father's detention. The family was forced into exile.

References 

Belarusian political prisoners
Belarusian businesspeople
Political prisoners according to Viasna Human Rights Centre
1974 births
Living people